Accession Records is a German independent record label created by Adrian Hates the frontman of the band Diary Of Dreams in 1995 year. Have a division sub-label, Succession Records, who recorded some bands until 2010.
 
Early in its existence, only DoD albums were released on the label, but in 1999 contracts were signed with other bands. At the same time, connections were made with overseas partner labels - Canadian Scratched! and American Metropolis Records.

The names of the bands under contract are mainly known in the Gothic, darkwave, neo-folk, (new) wave, EBM and industrial.

Artists
During its existence, such bands as:
 Angels of Venice
 Assemblage 23
 Claire Voyant
 Cleaner (band) (Cleen, Clear Vision)
 Diary of Dreams
 Diorama (band)
 Distorted Reality
 Lights of Euphoria
 Nerve.Filter
 Panzer AG
 SITD
 Faderhead
 Build 23
 Haujobb
 Sinin
 Human Decay
 Painkillers
 Clear Vision
 Cyber axis
  .com/kill
 Coma Alliance
 Spektralized
 Painbastard
 Audioscope
 Belief
 Cut.Rate.Box
 Plastic
 Silence
 Psyche

External links
 Discogs

German record labels
Industrial record labels